The Yale Bulldogs men's squash team is the intercollegiate men's squash team for Yale University located in New Haven, Connecticut. The team competes in the Ivy League within the College Squash Association. It is the oldest squash program in the country, dating back to 1920. Since 1942, Yale has won 13 national titles, only after Harvard and Trinity. Currently at the helm since 2021 is head coach Lynn Leong.

History 

 2016 National Champion

Year-by-year results

Men's Squash 
Updated February 2023.

Players

Current roster 
Updated February 2023.

|}

Notable former players 
Notable alumni include:
 Julian Illingworth '06, Highest world ranking of no. 24 (Highest American in PSA History), 10 PSA Titles, 4x All-American and 4x All-Ivy, 9x U.S. National Champion, 2005 and 2006 Individual National Champion
 Spencer Lovejoy '20, Current world no. 116, 3x 1st team All-American and 4x All-Ivy, Skillman Award Winner for best 4 year career

References

External links

External links 
 

 
Squash in Connecticut
College men's squash teams in the United States
Sports clubs established in 1920
1920 establishments in Connecticut